Antennacanthopodia is a rare unarmoured lobopodian from the Chengjiang biota, with prickly legs, a pair of 'antennae', and an onychophoran-like body outline (Early Cambrian, ~520 Ma). It also has a pair of frontal antennae, potential ocellus-like lateral visual organs, second antennae possibly homologous to the slime papillae of modern Onychophorans, a straight, voluminous midgut, diminutive spines arrayed on the leg and the trunk, well-developed leg musculature, highly sclerotized terminal leg pads, and presumptively a pair of posteriormost appendicules.

References

Lobopodia
Maotianshan shales fossils
Cambrian invertebrates
Fossil taxa described in 2011
Prehistoric protostome genera
†Antennacanthopodia

Cambrian genus extinctions